Lovely Standards is the fourth studio album by American R&B-soul singer-songwriter Amel Larrieux, released in the United States on May 22, 2007, by Blisslife Records. It consists of a collection of covers of Great American Songbook jazz standards.

Background
In an interview with Nu-Soul Magazine in late April 2009, Larrieux said of the album: "[W]e knew that it was gonna be a real niche album. It was gonna be about people that were truly loyal to me as an artist and willing to go wherever I was going." She went on to say that the album is geared toward people who "really do like jazz for jazz, not because the artist that they know is doing it, but they listen to jazz and they're understanding of being experimental within that form." Larrieux continues, referring to husband and producer Laru Larrieux: "We purposely only pressed up a small amount of albums, and you know, didn't go huge with it. We kind of wanted to feel our way around it, and view it as a kinda small intimate thing."

Track listing
"If I Were a Bell" (Frank Loesser) – 3:20
"Try Your Wings" (Michael Barr, Dion McGregor) – 3:17
"Lucky to Be Me" (Leonard Bernstein, Adolph Green, Betty Comden) – 5:01
"Wild Is the Wind" (Dimitri Tiomkin, Ned Washington) – 2:57
"Shadow of Your Smile" (Johnny Mandel, Paul Francis Webster) – 2:53
"You're My Thrill" (Jay Gorney, Sidney Clare) – 3:34
"Younger Than Springtime" (Richard Rodgers, Oscar Hammerstein II) – 4:50
"Something Wonderful" (Rodgers, Hammerstein) – 3:31
"If I Loved You" (Rodgers, Hammerstein) – 3:03
"I Like the Sunrise" (Duke Ellington) – 4:54

Original versions

Personnel

Musicians
Amel Larrieux – vocals
Adrian Harpham – drums
Keith Witty – strings, double bass

Production
Amel Larrieux – arranger
Laru Larrieux – producer, executive producer, arranger
Kwame Harris - [(recorded music)]
Joe Ferla – mixing
Mark Wilder – mastering
Ruven Afanador – photography

Charts

Release history

References

External links

2007 albums
Amel Larrieux albums
Covers albums